Harvey Alpheus Gallup (1869–1946) was an American politician who served as a Massachusetts State Senator, on the city council of and as the twelfth Mayor of North Adams, Massachusetts.  Records indicate he was either born on Oct. 7 or 17th in Clarksburg, Berkshire County, Massachusetts, and died on August 6, 1946, in Adams, Berkshire County, Massachusetts.

Insurance Agency
In 1891 Gallup formed the Harvey A. Gallup Agency with his brother Clarence.

See also
 1925–1926 Massachusetts legislature
 1927–1928 Massachusetts legislature

Notes

1869 births
1946 deaths
Massachusetts city council members
Republican Party Massachusetts state senators
Mayors of North Adams, Massachusetts
People from Berkshire County, Massachusetts